A customs territory is a geographic territory with uniform customs regulations and there are no internal customs or similar taxes within the territory. Customs territories may fall into several types:
 A sovereign state, including a federation
 A trade bloc that has a customs union
 An autonomous or dependent territory 

There are also some unregulated lands (usually uninhabited) not part of any customs territory.

As of 2010, most customs unions rarely operate as a single entity and are represented in relations with other customs territories either jointly by their member state governments and the union institutions or by only the member states. Thus, in practice, they rarely appear as a single customs territory and instead they operate as a multiple separate customs territories that have the same or similar customs tariffs. The European Union (EU) is the only trade bloc in which the union institutions have exclusive competence over the common external tariff and thus sign and ratify agreements with foreign states without direct participation of the EU member states. The EU is also the only trade bloc member of the World Trade Organization, but the EU member states also continue their own separate memberships, as not all of the WTO issues fall within the scope of exclusive EU competences.

The governing organs (government or other responsible administrative entity for the states and territories, secretariat or similar international organization body for the trade blocs) of the customs territories negotiate and sign trade agreements. In some cases the negotiations are conducted by a trade bloc secretariat, but the actual agreement is signed by the member states of the trade bloc. It is also possible for a group of customs territories, that do not form a customs union (regardless if they cooperate as a different type of trade bloc), to negotiate trade agreements together and to sign the resulting agreement individually (for example, the European Free Trade Association).

A customs territory usually has inspection stations at its borders. There can also be border checks between two parts of the same customs territory. For example, there are border checks between the Schengen Area portions of the EU customs territory and those portions in the Common Travel Area formed by the United Kingdom, Crown Dependencies, and Ireland.  Another example is the border checks between Israel and the Palestinian Territories, which are in a customs union.  The European Union example is particularly complicated, since it also has different boundaries for EU VAT area, the EU excise duty area, the area where EU law applies, and the area considered by the EU statistics agency.

List of customs territories 

Countries which are members of a customs union, which in some cases may be considered a single customs territory:
 Andean Community of Nations (CAN)
 
 
 
 
 Caribbean Community (CARICOM)
 
 
 
 
 
 
 
 
 
 
 
 
 
 Other CARICOM member states, The Bahamas and Haiti are not a part of the customs union arrangement although Haiti is in the process of acceding.
 East African Community (EAC)
 
 
 
 
 
 Eurasian Customs Union
 
 
 
 
 
 European Union Customs Union  (internal border checks) - includes the territory of  member countries, excepting many areas outside of continental Europe, and some exclaves and border areas.  (See Special member state territories and the European Union for a detailed list.)  Various treaties extend the EU customs area to include the non-EU states of:
  (excluding agricultural produce)
 
 
  (excluding agricultural produce)
  in respect of 
  —  customs union (internal border checks)
 Southern Common Market (MERCOSUR)
 
 
 
 
 
  (pending as of May 2014)
 Southern African Customs Union (SACU)

  —  — Büsingen am Hochrhein customs union (no external border checks)

The following dependent United States territories are outside the customs territory and most administer customs separately:
  - Government of American Samoa
  - Government of Guam
  - Government of the Commonwealth of the Northern Mariana Islands
 United States Minor Outlying Islands
 Wake Island - Department of the Air Force General Counsel 
 Midway Islands - Department of the Navy
 Johnston Atoll - none
 (Other islands are uninhabited, although Palmyra Atoll, administered by the Fish and Wildlife Service, is permanently staffed and has several private land parcels.  It has no customs administration or duties.)
  - Federal rules as modified by the Virgin Islands legislature, but implemented by U.S. Customs and Border Protection

The following customs territories are outside the customs territory of the :
 Special Administrative Region of the People's Republic of China
 , autonomous territory of PR China
 , autonomous territory of PR China
   (Taiwan) (officially titled as Separate Customs Territory of Taiwan, Penghu, Kinmen, and Matsu or Chinese Taipei in the WTO)

 United Kingdom–Crown Dependencies Customs Union

• United Kingdom 

• Crown Dependencies

- Channel Islands (Jersey  &  Guernsey)

- Isle Of Man

See also 
 List of free economic zones
 Customs area
 Economic integration
 Special member state territories and the European Union - multiple separate customs territories
 Member states of the World Customs Organization

References

External links
 

Economic integration
Customs duties
Commercial policy